The Blue Crab 11, also called the Gloucester 11, is an American utility dinghy that can be rowed, used as a motorboat or as a sailing dinghy. It was designed by Harry R. Sindle and first built in 1971. The design is named for the family of crustaceans.

Production
The design was built by Lockley Newport Boats and Mobjack Manufacturing in the United States, but it is now out of production. Lockley Newport Boats was originally known as Newport Boats and later known as Gloucester Yachts. A total of 900 examples of then type were completed.

Design
The Blue Crab 11 is a recreational sailboat, built predominantly of fiberglass. It has a fractional sloop rig, with a loose-footed mainsail and aluminum spars, a raked stem, a plumb transom, a transom-hung rudder controlled by a tiller and a retractable daggerboard. It displaces .

The boat has a reinforced transom to allow the fitting of a small outboard motor.

For sailing the design is equipped with transom-mount mainsheet traveler and can be sailed by one person, although a crew of two is used for racing. When sailed three people may be carried and as a motorboat it has a capacity of five people.

The design has a Portsmouth Yardstick racing average handicap of 110.8.

Operational history
In a 1994 review Richard Sherwood wrote, "Blue Crab is a beginner’s boat. It is dry and easily rigged, and it can be sailed by one person. For its size, it is a light boat and may be car-topped or trailered. Capacity is three adults. The transom is reinforced, so additional brackets are not required for an outboard. Blue Crab may be rowed; when not sailing, it has a capacity of five adults."

See also
List of sailing boat types

Similar boats
Echo 12
Puffer (dinghy)
Shrimp (dinghy)
Skunk 11

References

Dinghies
1970s sailboat type designs
Sailboat type designs by Harry R. Sindle
Sailboat types built by Lockley Newport Boats
Sailboat types built by Mobjack Manufacturing